The U.S. Environmental Protection Agency’s (EPA's) Safer Choice label, previously known as the Design for the Environment (DfE) label, helps consumers and commercial buyers identify and select products with safer chemical ingredients, without sacrificing quality or performance. When a product has the Safer Choice label, it means that every intentionally-added ingredient in the product has been evaluated by EPA scientists. Only the safest possible functional ingredients are allowed in products with the Safer Choice label.

Safer Choice is a voluntary partnership program that is grounded in more than 40 years of EPA experience in evaluating the human health and environmental characteristics of chemicals. As of January 2015, more than 2,000 products qualify to carry the Safer Choice label. Businesses can apply to become partners by submitting their products to the Safer Choice program for review.

Introduction 
Since the mid-2000s, EPA's label for safer chemical products has been known as the Design for the Environment, or the DfE label. After spending more than a year collecting ideas and discussing new label options with stakeholders, such as product manufacturers and environmental and health advocates, the EPA took its ideas to consumers and asked what worked best. The result is the new Safer Choice label.

Products that carry the Safer Choice label must meet requirements for:
 Safer chemical ingredients
 Product performance
 Packaging sustainability
 Ingredient disclosure 
 Surveillance and audits 
 Volatile Organic Compounds (VOCs) emissions

History 
EPA's Safer Choice Program is a renaming of the Design for the Environment (DfE) Safer Product Labeling Program.  DfE began in the early 1990s as an innovative, voluntary program to help companies consider human health, environmental, and economic effects of chemicals and technologies. DfE started the Safer Product Labeling Program as a project with the chemical-based products industry (e.g. cleaners and detergents) to help leading companies use safer chemicals to make high-performing products. DfE developed this certification program based on its Standard for Safer Products and safer chemical criteria, allowing companies to differentiate their products in the marketplace and making it easier for consumers and business purchasers to identify products that are safer for workers, families, pets, and the environment.

Using its science-based criteria that defines safer chemistry by chemical class, Safer Choice has helped the industry innovate and develop safer chemicals and chemical-based products. A number of companies have designed new chemicals to meet Safer Choice criteria, or invested in research to show that existing chemicals are safer.

In March 2015, the Safer Choice label replaced the DfE product label, marking the transition from the Safer Product Labeling Program to the Safer Choice Program. The new Safer Choice label helps consumers, businesses and institutional buyers easily recognize products that have earned EPA's Safer Choice certification.

In addition to the Safer Choice label above, Safer Choice offers an optional label that product manufacturers may use on products designated for businesses, office buildings, sports venues and schools. Safer Choice also has a label that indicates that a product is fragrance-free, to help consumers who prefer products without fragrance.

Meaning of the label 
When a product carries the Safer Choice label, it means that every intentionally added ingredient—no exceptions, no de minimis—in the product has been reviewed by EPA scientists. Only products that meet the Safer Choice Standard, which includes stringent human health and environmental criteria, are allowed to carry the label.

Safer Choice evaluates the individual constituents of every proprietary component of a product to ensure that it does not contain chemicals that may present potential health or environmental effects, including ingredients used in small percentages, like fragrances, preservatives, and dyes.

Safer Choice further requires its partners to undergo annual reviews, including on-site audits, to verify product ingredients and ensure compliance with all Safer Choice Program requirements.

Qualifications to receive the label 
Companies that enter into partnership with the Safer Choice Program and meet the Safer Choice Standard do so voluntarily. Companies that manufacture Safer Choice products have invested heavily in research and reformulation to ensure that their ingredients and finished products line up on the greener end of the health and environmental spectrum. These companies are leaders in safer products and sustainability.

Types of products Safer Choice labels 
Safer Choice labels a wide range of products for consumer and industry use, including:
 All-purpose cleaners
 Athletic field paints
 Bathroom cleaners
 Car cleaners
 Carpet cleaners
 Degreasers
 Dish detergents and hand soaps
 Floor care products
 Glass cleaners
 Laundry products
 Metal cleaners
 Pet care products
 Septic treatment products
 Wood cleaners
 Fragrances

Safer Chemical Ingredients List 
The Safer Chemical Ingredients List (SCIL) is a list of chemical ingredients that the Safer Choice Program has evaluated and determined to be safer than traditional chemical ingredients used for the same function. This list is arranged by functional-use class and is designed to help manufacturers find safer chemical alternatives that meet the criteria of the Safer Choice Program. Safer Choice ensures that no confidential or trade secret information appears in the list.

The Safer Choice Standard and the Criteria for Safer Chemical Ingredients are protective and address a broad range of potential toxicological effects (e.g., carcinogenicity, chronic toxicity and aquatic toxicity). All chemicals in the listing are among the safest for their functional use.

Safer Choice Partner of the Year Awards 
In 2015, the Safer Choice Program launched its Partner of the Year Awards to recognize program participants who have demonstrated leadership in furthering safer chemistry and products.

See also 
Other EPA labeling programs
 Energy Star - Energy-efficient products
 WaterSense - Water-efficient products

External links

References 

Product safety
Sustainable design
Safer Choice